Homalopoma maculosa is a species of sea snail, a marine gastropod mollusk in the family Colloniidae.

Description
The white shell is small, globose and umbilicate. It is rather thin and shining. It is concentrically irregularly ribbed. The interstices are grooved, concave and transversely very faintly striate The ribs are spotted remotely with rose red. The altitude is about equal to the diameter. The subsutural rib is frequently nodose. The umbilicus is crenated within the margin.

Distribution
This species occurs in the Pacific Ocean off French Polynesia, Hawaii and the Marshall Islands.

References
Notes

Bibliography
 Williams S.T., Karube S. & Ozawa T. (2008) Molecular systematics of Vetigastropoda: Trochidae, Turbinidae and Trochoidea redefined. Zoologica Scripta 37: 483–506.

Colloniidae
Gastropods described in 1868